Farhat Begum  is a Pakistani politician who has been a member of the National Assembly of Pakistan from 2008 to 2013.

Political career
She was elected to the National Assembly of Pakistan as a candidate of Pakistan Peoples Party on a seat reserved for women from Khyber Pakhtunkhwa in the 2008 Pakistani general election.

References

Pakistani MNAs 2008–2013
Pakistan People's Party politicians